Knau is a village and a former municipality in the district Saale-Orla-Kreis, in Thuringia, Germany. The former municipality Bucha was merged into Knau in January 2019. Since December 2019, it is part of the town Neustadt an der Orla.

References

Former municipalities in Thuringia
Saale-Orla-Kreis